Synd for dig is a song by Danish singer Medina from her third studio album For altid. It was released as the second single from the album on 19 September 2011. "Synd for dig" peaked at number one in Denmark, becoming Medina's seventh number-one single.

Track listing
 Danish digital download
 "Synd For Dig" – 3:29

 Danish iTunes digital download remix
 "Synd For Dig" (ELOQ Remix Feat. KIDD) – 3:37

Charts and certifications

Charts

Year-end charts

Certifications

Release history

References

External links
 

2011 singles
Dubstep songs
Medina (singer) songs
Number-one singles in Denmark
Songs written by Jeppe Federspiel
Songs written by Rasmus Stabell
Songs written by Medina (singer)